The Mormon colonies in Mexico are settlements located near the Sierra Madre mountains in northern Mexico which were established by members of the Church of Jesus Christ of Latter-day Saints (LDS Church) beginning in 1885. The colonists came to Mexico due to federal attempts to curb and prosecute polygamy in the United States. Plural marriage, as polygamous relationships were called by church members, was an important tenet of the church—although it was never practiced by a majority of the membership.

The towns making up the colonies were situated in the Mexican states of Chihuahua and Sonora, and were all within roughly 200 miles (322 km) south of the US border. By the early 20th century, many of these settlements were relatively prosperous. However, in the summer of 1912, the colonies were evacuated en masse because of anti-American sentiment during the Mexican Revolution. Most of the colonists left for the United States and never returned, although a small group of Latter-day Saints eventually found their way back to homes and farms in the colonies. Because new plural marriages in Mexico had been prohibited by the church following the Second Manifesto of 1904, generally, those who returned to the original colonies did not enter into new plural marriages and remained members of the LDS Church. Many of their descendants live in Colonia Juárez and Colonia Dublán, the only two settlements of the original colonies that remain active. In 1999, the church constructed the Colonia Juárez Chihuahua Mexico Temple to serve members still living in the area.

After the Second Manifesto was issued, the LDS Church began to excommunicate members who entered into new polygamist marriages. This resulted in excommunicated members forming their own churches, and these off-shoot groups (known as fundamentalist Mormons) are not affiliated with the LDS Church. Some of these fundamentalist groups later established new colonies and settlements in areas near the original Latter-day Saint Mexican and Canadian colonies. One fundamentalist group, the LeBaron family, had established Colonia Le Barón in the state of Chihuahua by the 1920s. Many descendants of these fundamentalist Mormons continue to live in the newer settlements, although not all continue to practice polygamy.

Latter-day Saint colonies

Early colonization
As early as 1874, Brigham Young, President of the LDS Church, called for a mission to Mexico. In 1875, settlers set out with the dual purpose of proselytizing and finding prospective locations for Latter-day Saint settlements. The missionaries returned with positive reports the next year and another group was sent in October 1876. In 1877, Young discussed the idea of colonizing parts of northern Mexico, but it was considered unwise due to the considerable danger from Apache raiders in the area. Young died later that year and leadership of the church fell to John Taylor as President of the Quorum of the Twelve Apostles. John Taylor was ordained as Prophet in 1880.

Taylor continued Young's policy of missionary work in Mexico, and through the early 1880s colonization was considered on several occasions without effort to begin the process. However, in 1882 the Edmunds Act was passed by the United States Congress. This was part of the by-then 20-year struggle by the U.S. government to curb the LDS practice of plural marriage in Utah Territory and other locations in the American West. Among other things, the law felonized the practice of polygamy and disenfranchised polygamists. As a result, over a thousand Latter-day Saint men and women were eventually fined and jailed. Some were sent as far away as Michigan to fulfill their terms.

In 1885 President John Taylor purchased 100,000 acres of land in Mexico. This act allowed over 350 Latter-day Saint families who practiced polygamy from Utah and Arizona to settle land in Mexico. This was a very strenuous task, but it allowed the men the opportunity to keep their multiple wives without being fined and jailed. These people started their own farming colonies and established their settlements in Chihuahua and Sonora, where they focused their labors on sheep, cattle, wheat, row crops, and fruit orchards.

End of new plural marriages
In September 1890, the president of the LDS Church issued the Manifesto which advised ending new plural marriages in the United States, although the practice was permitted to be continued in the colonies of Mexico and Canada. In 1904 the church issued the Second Manifesto, after which entering into new plural marriages was prohibited among the church membership worldwide. Neither the 1890 Manifesto or 1904 Second Manifesto ended existing plural marriages, and many of these families continued to cohabitate (with the blessing of the church) until their deaths in the 1940s and 1950s.

Evacuation and return
The anti-foreign sentiment of the Mexican Revolution in 1910 made life there for the Latter-day Saint colonists difficult, with many threats to their lives and property; the colonists returned to the United States. When it was decided it was safe, less than one-quarter of the previous population re-settled to Mexico; most of the refugees returned to their Utah and Arizona colonies of origin. The Mexican Latter-day Saints' colonies did not return to their previous success due to the poor living conditions and farming land. Only two colonies remain: Colonia Dublán and Colonia Juárez.

List of Latter-day Saint colonies

Plateau colonies
 Colonia Díaz
 Colonia Juárez
 Colonia Dublán

Mountain colonies
 Colonia Pacheco
 Cave Valley
 Colonia Chuichupa
 Colonia García (Round Valley)

Sonora colonies
 Colonia Oaxaca
 Colonia Morelos
 Colonia San José

Prominent citizens
Members of the Romney family have roots in these colonies, including both Marion G. Romney and George W. Romney having been born there.

Latter-day Saint colonies in other areas of Mexico
Many Latter-day Saint settlements in the United States are in areas that at one time belonged to Mexico, but nearly all of these were already part of the United States at the time of settlement. The exception is Salt Lake City itself, which was settled in the summer of 1847 in what was at the time legally a remote part of the Mexican territory of Alta California. However, the ongoing territorial disputes incident to the Mexican–American War brought the area officially under US control in 1848 as part of the Mexican Cession.

Fundamentalist Mormon colonies
After the Second Manifesto was issued, the LDS Church began to excommunicate members who entered into new polygamist marriages. This resulted in excommunicated members forming their own churches, and these off-shoot groups (known as fundamentalist Mormons) are not affiliated with the LDS Church. Some of these fundamentalist groups later established new colonies and settlements in areas near the original Latter-day Saint Mexican and Canadian colonies. One fundamentalist group, the LeBaron family, had established Colonia Le Barón in the state of Chihuahua by the 1920s. Many descendants of these fundamentalist Mormons continue to live in the newer settlements, although not all continue to practice polygamy.

List of fundamentalist Mormon colonies
Colonia Le Barón
 Colonia Industrial de la Nueva Jerusalén, Ozumba México
 La Mora. Bavispe, Sonora
 Chulavista, Quintana Roo

Book
Mormon Colonies in Mexico is also the title of a 1938 book by Thomas Cottam Romney. The book details the story of Mormons who sought refuge in Mexico after fleeing from US authorities for polygamy. The book is published by the University of Utah Press.

See also
 The Church of Jesus Christ of Latter-day Saints in Mexico
 Margarito Bautista
 Mennonites in Mexico
Mormon Corridor
 State of Deseret
 Latter-day Saint settlements in Canada
 Third Convention

References

Further reading
.

External links
 Mormon Colonies in Mexico Wiki
 Mormon Colonies in Northern Chihuahua, Mexico

American diaspora in Mexico
Mexican Colonies
Mormonism and polygamy
The Church of Jesus Christ of Latter-day Saints in Mexico
Immigration to Mexico